This is a list of broadcast television stations that are licensed in the U.S. state of Minnesota.

Full-power stations
VC refers to the station's PSIP virtual channel. RF refers to the station's physical RF channel.

Defunct full-power stations
 Channel 7: KCCO-TV NBC/ABC, CBS Alexandria (10/8/1958–12/30/2017; satellite of WCCO-TV after 1987)
 Channel 11: WMIN-TV ABC/DuMont St. Paul/Minneapolis (9/1/1953-4/3/1955, shared time with WTCN-TV)
 Channel 38: WFTV NBC/CBS/ABC/DuMont Duluth (5/31/1953-7/11/1954)

LPTV stations

Translators

External links
 Northpine.com: Upper Midwest Broadcasting

Minnesota
 
Television stations